Nando is a name for males - often in Switzerland (Graubünden) and Italy. It is often a short form (hypocorism) of Fernando.

Other forms are Ferdinand (male; Germanic) and Nándor (male; Hungarian) and Nanna/Nanda/Nande (female).

Etymology 
Germanic: nantha → bold, reckless, brave

People named Nando 
 Fernando García Puchades (born 1994) Spanish footballer commonly known as Nando
 Nando (footballer, born May 1967), Spanish footballer Fernando Martínez Perales
 Nando (footballer, born October 1967), Spanish footballer Fernando Muñoz García
 Nando (Mozambican footballer) (1982–2007), Mozambican footballer Fernando Paulo Matola
 Nando (Timorese footballer) (born 1985)
 Fernando Altimani (1893–1963), Italian racewalker
 Nandcoomar Nando Bodha (born 1954), Mauritian politician, former Minister of Tourism & Leisure and former Minister of Agriculture
 Fernando Nando Bruno (1895–1963), Italian actor
 Fernando Nando Cicero (1931–1995), Italian film director, screenwriter and actor
 Fernando Manuel Co (born 1973), Bissau-Guinean former footballer
 Nando de Colo (born 1987), French basketball player
 Nando de Freitas, Zimbabwean computer scientist and Oxford professor
 Fernando García Puchades (born 1994), Spanish footballer commonly known as Nando
 Nando Gatti (1927–?), South African lawn bowler
 Ferdinando Gentile (born 1967), Italian former basketball player
 Fernando Gómez Herrera (born 1984), Spanish footballer commonly known as Nando
 Fernando González Valenciaga (1921–1988), Spanish footballer better known as Nando
 Ferdinando Minoia (1884–1940), Italian racing driver
 Fernando Nando Maria Neves (born 1978), Cape Verdean footballer
 Fernando Nando Parrado (born 1949), Uruguayan plane crash survivor
 Fernando Orsi (born 1959), Italian football manager and former goalkeeper
 Fernando Quesada (born 1994), Spanish footballer
 Nando Rafael (born 1984), Angolan footballer
 Nando Reis (born 1963), Brazilian musician born José Fernando Gomes dos Reis
 Miguel Vera (1932–1952), United States Army soldier posthumously awarded the Medal of Honor
 Nando Wormgoor (born 1992), Dutch footballer
 Nando Yosu (1939–2016), Spanish footballer Fernando Trío Zabala

Masculine given names
Hypocorisms

it:Nando